List of cricket matches played by the men's Australian Indigenous cricket team. This team has also been known as the Australian Aboriginal cricket team, Australian Indigenous XI and the ATSIC Chairperson's XI.

List of matches

Matches 1–48

Matches 49–100

Match 101 – onwards

Record

References
 Australian Aboriginal XI matches 
 Indigenous XI matches 
 ACB Indigenous matches 

Indigenous matches
Indigenous matches
Cricket matches
Cricket matches